Dion Ruffo Luci (born 12 July 2001) is an Italian professional footballer who plays as a midfielder for  club Turris, on loan from Bologna.

Club career
Ruffo Luci made his professional debut with Bologna in a 2–2 Serie A tie with Parma on 12 July 2020.

On 26 July 2021, he was loaned to Trento on a two-year loan. 

On 31 January 2023, Ruffo Luci moved on a new loan to Turris.

References

External links

2001 births
Living people
Footballers from Bologna
Italian footballers
Association football midfielders
Serie A players
Serie C players
Bologna F.C. 1909 players
A.C. Trento 1921 players
S.S. Turris Calcio players